A sablazo limpio (A Quick Saber Slash) is a 1958 Mexican historical-comedy film directed by Fernando Cortés and starring Marco Antonio Campos and Gaspar Henaine as the double act Viruta y Capulina, and Lucho Gatica with Carmela Rey. Set during the era of the Spanish viceroyalties, the film follows the adventures of two clumsy blacksmiths who become the servants of a masked-hero in disguise who is willing to uncover the uncontrolled spending and injustices of a governor and his military captain.

Cast
Marco Antonio Campos as Cornelius Viruta
Gaspar Henaine as Crispín Capulina
Lucho Gatica as "La Mascara Solitaria"
Carmela Rey as Rosaura
Rodolfo Landa as Captain Mendoza
Guillermina Téllez Girón as María
Luis Aldás as Jeremías de Montalbán
Pedro de Aguillón as The Governor of Villa Paz
Guillermo Álvarez Bianchi as María's father
Florencio Castelló as "Faraón" (uncredited)
Ricardo Adalid as Jail doorman (uncredited)

Production
The film is notable for its lavish sets and costumes, designed by award-winning production designer Jorge Fernández, which accurately correspond to the historical era of the Spanish viceroyalties.

Reception
A sablazo limpio premiered on November 20, 1958, in the Mariscala and Olimpia movie theaters for two weeks.

References

External links

Mexican historical comedy films
1950s historical comedy films
1958 comedy films
1950s Spanish-language films
1950s Mexican films